Julie Morstad is a Canadian writer and illustrator of children's books.

Career 
After coming to the attention of Simply Read Books publisher Dimiter Savoff through her work in the Vancouver arts scene, Morstad was asked to illustrate Sara O'Leary's When You Were Small in 2006. Morstad made her authorial debut in 2013 with How To, published by Simply Read Books.

Awards and nominations 
Morstad illustrated When You Were Small, which won the 2006 Marilyn Baillie Picture Book Award. She is a three-time nominee for the Governor General's Award for English-language children's illustration, receiving nods at the 2013 Governor General's Awards for How To, at the 2014 Governor General's Awards for Julia, Child, and at the 2022 Governor General's Awards for Time Is a Flower. How To and Time is a Flower also won the Marilyn Baillie Picture Book Award. In 2019, she won the Elizabeth Mrazik-Cleaver Canadian Picture Book Award for Bloom. It Began With a Page: How Gyo Fujikawa Drew the Way was nominated for the 2020 TD Canadian Children’s Literature Award.

Personal life 
Morstad has a brother named Paul. At age 20, she gave birth to her first child.

Works 

 When You Were Small (2006) – Illustrator, written by Sara O'Leary
 Milk Teeth (2007) – Illustrator
 Where You Came From (2008) – Illustrator, written by Sara O'Leary
 When I Was Small (2011) – Illustrator, written by Sara O'Leary
 The Wayside (2012) – Illustrator
 The Swing (2012) – Illustrator, written by Robert Louis Stevenson
 How To (2013) – Writer and illustrator
 Julia, Child (2014)  – Illustrator, written by Kyo Maclear
 This Is Sadie, (2015) – Illustrator, written by Sara O'Leary
 Swan: The Life and Dance of Anna Pavlova (2015)  – Illustrator, written by Laurel Snyder
 Sometimes We Think You Are a Monkey (2015) – Illustrator, written by Johanna Skibsrud and Sarah Blacker
 Today (2016) – Writer and illustrator
 When Green Becomes Tomatoes: Poems for All Seasons (2016)  – Illustrator, written by Julie Fogliano
 Singing Away the Dark (2017)  – Illustrator, written by Caroline Woodward
 Bloom: A Story of Fashion Designer Elsa Schiaparelli (2018)  – Illustrator, written by Kyo Maclear
 The Dress and the Girl (2018)  – Illustrator, written by Camille Andros
 House of Dreams: The Life of L. M. Montgomery (2018) – Illustrator, written by Liz Rosenberg
 It Began with a Page: How Gyo Fujikawa Drew the Way (2019) – Illustrator, written by Kyo Maclear
 Show Me A Sign (2020) – Illustrator, written by Ann Clare LeZotte
 Girl on a Motorcycle (2020) – Illustrator, written by Amy Novesky
 Time is a Flower (2022) – Writer and illustrator

Other:

 Cover art for Mary Ann Meets the Gravediggers and Other Short Stories (2006)
 Cover art for Fox Confessor Brings the Flood (2006)

References

External links

21st-century Canadian women writers
21st-century Canadian women artists
Canadian children's writers
Canadian illustrators
Canadian women illustrators
Living people
Year of birth missing (living people)